Lucas Ezequiel Viatri (born 29 March 1987) is an Argentine footballer who plays as a striker for Peñarol. He was capped three times for Argentina.

Career
Viatri started his playing career with loan spells with Emelec of Ecuador and Unión Atlético Maracaibo of Venezuela. He returned to Boca Juniors in 2008.

On 17 May 2008, Viatri made his debut with Boca in a game 2–1 victory over Racing Club. In August 2008 he was part of the squad that won the 2008 Recopa Sudamericana. Subsequently, during the Apertura 2008 he was a regular on the first team and helped them get the championship title by scoring 8 goals, one of them at the Superclásico.

On 2 July 2014, Viatri transferred to Chinese Super League side Shanghai Shenhua. On July 15, 2014, Viatri made his debut with Shanghai Shenhua in a China FA Cup game against Chongqing Lifan, he scored twice and made an assist to help the super league side won 3–0. Six days later, Viatri scored twice again to let Shenhua won 3–2 against Liaoning Whowin in a Chinese Super League game.

On 11 August 2017 Lucas was acquired by Peñarol.

International career

International appearances and goals

Criminal charge
In 2008, before his Boca Juniors debut, Viatri was detained for 30 days, accused of committing an armed robbery to a hairdressing salon. Viatri was processed and subject to an oral proceeding. In the proceeding, the footballer agreed to a probation, and therefore was never sentenced guilty for the crime.

In 2009, the court that dealt with his case sentenced that he could not move outside Argentina before his probation finished, therefore thwarting his possibilities of transferring outside the country.

Honours 
Boca Juniors
 Primera División: 2008 Apertura, 2011 Apertura
 Copa Argentina: 2011–12
 Recopa Sudamericana: 2008

Peñarol
 Uruguayan Primera División: 2017, 2018
 Supercopa Uruguaya: 2018

Notes

References

External links
 Argentine Primera statistics at Fútbol XXI  
 
 Viatri, Lucas Ezequiel at Historia de Boca.com 
 

1987 births
Living people
Argentine people of Italian descent
Footballers from Buenos Aires
Argentine footballers
Argentina international footballers
Association football forwards
Argentine Primera División players
Chinese Super League players
Uruguayan Primera División players
Boca Juniors footballers
Club Atlético Banfield footballers
Estudiantes de La Plata footballers
C.S. Emelec footballers
Chiapas F.C. footballers
Peñarol players
Shanghai Shenhua F.C. players
Club Atlético Colón footballers
Argentine expatriate footballers
Expatriate footballers in Ecuador
Expatriate footballers in Venezuela
Expatriate footballers in Mexico
Expatriate footballers in Uruguay
Expatriate footballers in China
Argentine expatriate sportspeople in Ecuador
Argentine expatriate sportspeople in Venezuela
Argentine expatriate sportspeople in Mexico
Argentine expatriate sportspeople in Uruguay
Argentine expatriate sportspeople in China